Shalu Susan Kurian is an Indian actress who has worked in Malayalam and Tamil-language television productions. She is known for her work on the television series Chandanamazha, which aired on Asianet.

She made her debut in the 2008 film Jubilee and went on to act in television serials such as Swami Ayyappan, Nizhalkkannadi, Kadamattathachan and Snehakoodu.

Biography
Kurian attended BMS school, Vazhoor St. Paul's and MD Seminary. She gained a degree at Bacelious college, Kottayam. She lives in Kottayam. She is married to Melvin and has a son, Alister Melvin.

Filmography

Television
All TV series are in Malayalam language unless noted otherwise.

As host
Telephone Moneyphone (Asianet Plus)

Other TV shows

 Ningalkkum Aakaam Kodeeshwaran (Asianet)
 Sell Me the Answer (Asianet)
 Run Baby Run (Asianet)
 Smart Show (Flowers TV) 
 Kuttykalavara (Flowers TV)
 Deal or No Deal (Surya TV)
 Tamar Padar (Flowers TV) 
 Aswamedham (Kairali TV)
 Boeing Boeing (Zee Keralam)
 Jollywood Show (Kairali TV)
Suryajodi (Surya TV)
Urvashi Theatres (Asianet)
 Onnum Onnum Moonu (Mazhavil Manorama)

Films

Awards

References

External links 
 

Living people
Indian film actresses
Actresses from Kochi
1989 births
Actresses in Malayalam cinema
Actresses in Tamil cinema
Actresses in Malayalam television
Indian television actresses
21st-century Indian actresses